Kyi (Kiy; Ukrainian: Кий, Kyi) was the legendary founder of Kyiv and the Kyi dynasty, and the Prince (Knyaz) of the Polans. He was one of four siblings (brothers Kyi, Shchek, and Khoryv, and sister Lybid), who, according to the Primary Chronicle, lived in the Dnieper mountains and built a city on the right high bank of the Dnieper, named Kyiv, after the eldest brother. Kyi was also named the founder of the town of Kyivets on the Danube. From Kyi and his brothers the chroniclers deduced the Polans tribe.

Parallel evidence 
In the Armenian "History of Taron" by Zenob Glak (VIII century) it is mentioned that three brothers: Quar(or Kuar.A name after city of kyiv), Meltei (Mile) and Horean(Khoriv) founded three cities in the country Poluny, and after some time they built a settlement on Mount Kerkey, where there was space for hunting, lots of grass and trees. This story with its names and details is very reminiscent of the testimony of the Kyiv chronicler. An explanation for this can be found both in the common source (probably Scythian) of Ukrainian and Armenian legends, and in the common mythological plot used to explain the founding of the many cows that inhabit the city.

Byzantine sources report that the Kievan prince Kyi (originally Kuver) was brought up at the court of Emperor Justinian I in his youth, converted to Christianity in Constantinople, and was educated there. "He had the great honor of the king," received benefits in the Lower Danube, where he founded the "town of Kiev", but due to resistance from local tribes could not gain a foothold there. That's why Kyi returned home, where he "laid" (probably rebuilt or moved from another city) his capital Kiev.

According to other Byzantine testimonies, Kyi was a contemporary of Emperor Heraclius (575–641). As his contemporary John of Nicaea writes in detail, "by the power of the Holy and Life-Giving Baptism he received, he defeated all barbarians and pagans." The friendly ties of the ancient prince with the Byzantine imperial court is evidenced by the "Primary Chronicle".

Archaeological evidence 
In the sixth to seventh centuries, the borders of three cultural groups of monuments converged on the Polans land — Kyiv Oblast — Prague, Penkiv and Kolochyn cultures, and in the eighth to tenth centuries — Luka-Raikovetska and Volyntsevo culture. From the very beginning, Kyiv was the center of not one, but several tribal groups.

The text of "Primary Chronicle" 
«И быша 3 брата, единому имя Кий, а другому Щекъ, а третьему Хоривъ, и сестра их Лыбѣдь. И сѣдяше Кий на горѣ, кдѣ нынѣ увозъ Боричевъ, а Щекъ сѣдяше на горѣ, кдѣ нынѣ зовется Щековица, а Хоривъ на третьей горѣ, отнюдуже прозвася Хоривіца; створиша городокъ, во имя брата ихъ старѣйшаго, и нарекоша его Киевъ. И бяше около города лѣсъ и боръ великъ, и бяху ловяще звѣрье. Бяхуть бо мудрѣ и смыслени, и нарицахуся Поляне, отъ нихъ же суть Поляне Кияне и до сего дни.Инии же, не вѣдуще, ркоша, яко Кий есть перевозникъ бысть; у Киева бо перевозъ бяше тогда съ оноя страны Днепра, тѣмь глаголаху: на перевозъ на Киевъ. Аще бо быль перевозникъ Кый, то не бы ходилъ къ Царюграду; но сий Кий княжаше в роду своем; и приходившю ему къ царю не свѣмы, но токмо о семъ вѣмы, якоже сказають, яко велику честь приялъ есть от царя, которого не вѣмъ и при которомъ приходи цари. Идущю же ему опять, приде къ Дунаеви, и възлюби мѣсто и сруби городокъ малъ, и хотяше сѣсти с родомъ своимъ, и не даша ему близъ живущии; еже и до нынѣ нарѣчють Дунайци городіще Киевѣць. Киеви же прішедшю въ свой городъ Киевъ, ту и сконча животъ свой, и брата его Щекъ и Хоривъ и сестра ихъ Лыбѣдь ту скончашася. И по сей братьи почаша дѣржати родъ ихъ княжение въ Поляхъ…(Filed according to the Hypatian Codex)

Legacy
 The city of Kyiv was named in his honor.
 In the center of Kyiv there is a monument to the founders of the city of Kyiv, among which the legendary Prince Kyi is depicted.

References

Further reading 

 В. М. Ричка. Кий // Енциклопедія історії України : у 10 т. / редкол.: В. А. Смолій (голова) та ін. ; Інститут історії України НАН України. — К. : Наукова думка, 2007. — Т. 4 : Ка — Ком. — С. 284. — 528 с. : іл. — ISBN 978-966-00-0692-8.

External links 
 

 Кий // Українська мала енциклопедія : 16 кн. : у 8 т. / проф. Є. Онацький. — Накладом Адміністратури УАПЦ в Аргентині. — Буенос-Айрес, 1959. — Т. 3, кн. V : Літери К — Ком. — С. 631-632. — 1000 екз.
 Кий, Щек, Хорив і Либідь // Михайлів Т. В., Михайлів Т. А. Видатні постаті українського державотворення. Довідник. — Xарків: Основа, 2014. — 128 с. — (Б-ка журн. „Історія та правознавство“. Вип. 1 (121)). — С. 5.
 Літопис про княжіння Кия, заснування Києва і держави Київська Русь (друга половина V — перша третина VI ст.) // Історія України: Хрестоматія / Упоряд. В. М. Литвин. — К. : Наук. думка, 2013. — 1056 с.
 Кий та його брати // Котляр М. Ф., Кульчицький С. В. Шляхами віків: Довідник з історії України. — К.: Україна, 1993. — 384 с.
 Кий — князь русі / Культура України
 Три брати — засновники Києва // Народні перекази та легенди
 До 1020-ліття хрещення України-Руси // Інтернет-представництво Президента України
 Князь Кий // Котляр М. Ф. Історія України в особах: Давньоруська держава.— К.: Україна, 1996
 Найдавніша легенда про заснування Києва // Сайт „Трипілля“
 „И нарекоши имя ему Киев“. Князь Кий — легенди та бувальщина // День, № 114, 14.07.2006
 Скільки років місту Києву? // Дзеркало тижня» № 21, 29.05.2004
 Городище Кия // Веб-енциклопедія «Київ»
 
 Князь Кий — рицар короля Артура // Народна правда
 «Сидел Кий на горе…» // Сайт «1 сентября» 
 Володимир Ільченко. Князь Кий був іранцем? // Журнал «Mandry»
 Урок від князя Кия // Обозреватель 
 Дан Берест. Літочислення Києва 
 Пам'ятні та ювілейні монети України // Сайт НБУ

Grand Princes of Kiev
Pages with unreviewed translations